Ürkməzli (also, Urkmagly and Urkmezli) is a village and municipality in the Qazakh Rayon of Azerbaijan.  It has a population of 1,151.

References 

Populated places in Qazax District